is a 2001 Japanese animated short experimental film directed by Tatsuo Satō, based on the manga created by Nekojiru. The surreal film follows Nyata, an anthropomorphic kitten, on his travel to the land of the dead and back in an effort to save his sister's soul. Cat Soup was released direct-to-DVD in Japan on 21 February 2001. Central Park Media licensed the film in North America under its Software Sculptors label and was released on DVD on September 9, 2003.

Plot
Nyaako, the older sister of Nyata, lies very ill in her room. By accident, Nyata drowns in the bathtub and, whilst being clinically dead, sees his sister leaving the house holding hands with the psychopomp Jizō and follows them. He tries to take his sister back from Jizō but it holds on to her, refusing to let go. Nyaako splits in two, leaving Jizō with half of her soul while her brother runs away with the other half. Jizō sends a clue about a flower they must seek to retrieve the lost half-soul, then walks away with it.

Meanwhile, Nyata's father finds him in the bathtub and revives him. The whole family gathers in Nyaako's room to discover she is spiritually dead. Nyata approaches carrying the half-soul and replaces it in her body through her nose. She awakens, now despondent and semi-catatonic. The siblings are sent by their mother to retrieve fried tofu. On the way, they attend the Big Whale Circus in time for the final act, in which a giant flightless bird containing various weathers causes an all-encompassing flood. The two find refuge on a sampan with a pig, whom they consensually and partially eat by unzipping his abdomen and pulling out pre-cut slabs. God holds the world above his head to drain its water down his arm, leaving the three lost in a desert. As the cats beat the pig to death, he bites off Nyata's arm. A local dollmaker soon appears to sew on a replacement salvaged from another cat.

Traveling across the desert, they are brought to a house by the smell of food, and are invited inside by a man. They are fed, and when full the man attempts to turn them into soup, attacking them with a pair of scissors. He ends up falling into the cauldron, Nyata cuts him into pieces with the scissors and the cats escape. Wandering further across the desert dehydrated, Nyata digs and finds an elephant made of water, which cools them off and travels with them, though the elephant eventually evaporates from the heat. God accidentally stops the flow of time and disrupts space, and the cats play with the time-frozen scenes. Father Time turns time back on, shooting it forward and reversing it, showing various scenes of random events either rapidly going forth in time or back. Eventually the cats find themselves back on their boat in the ocean. After dusk, they drift into a shallow marsh filled with tin sculptures of plants and mechanical animals. There they chance upon the flower they were seeking. Nyata places the flower on Nyaako's face, which restores her to normal. Together, they go back home.

The entire family of cats are gathered in their house leisurely watching TV. Nyata leaves them to visit the toilet, and while he is gone, the other family members disappear one by one into thin air. The show on the TV also disappears, leaving only a flashing screen behind. Nyata returns to find everyone gone. Outside the nearby lamppost extinguishes, leaving the house in darkness. The film also "turns off", leaving behind a flashing screen of static.

Background
The characters of Nyaako and Nyata first appeared in the June 1990 issue of the monthly manga magazine Garo.  They also appeared in a series of 27 two-minute television episodes, collectively titled .  The series appeared in 1999 as a segment on TV Asahi's .

Nekojiru (the artist) was born on January 19, 1967, and died by suicide on May 10, 1998.

Awards 
Cat Soup won an Excellence Prize (Animation Division) at the 2001 Japan Media Arts Festival, the "Best Short Film" award at the 2001 Fantasia Festival and the Silver Award for Animation 2003 New York Exposition of Short Film and Video.

References

External links 
  via Internet Archive
 
 
 Cat Soup reviewed by Beyond Hollywood
 

2001 anime films
Adventure anime and manga
Central Park Media
Comedy anime and manga
Anime short films
2000s animated short films
J.C.Staff
Japanese comedy films
Japanese adventure films
2000s adventure comedy films
Animated comedy films
Animated adventure films
Fictional cats
Japanese black comedy films